Vasanta or Vasantha may refer to:

 Vasanta (Ritu) or Basant, the spring season in the Hindu calendar
 Vasantha (raga), a musical scale in Carnatic music
 Vasanta College for Women, Rajghat, Uttar Pradesh, India
 Vasanta Group, a UK-based office supplies company